Ogirala may refer to :

 Ogirala, village in Bapulapadu mandal in Krishna District, Andhra Pradesh, India
 Peda Ogirala, village in Vuyyuru mandal, Krishna district, Andhra Pradesh, India
 China Ogirala, village in Vuyyuru mandal, Krishna district, Andhra Pradesh, India
 Ogirala Ramachandra Rao, famous playback singer and music director in Indian cinema (1905–1957)

Surnames of Indian origin